Hans Falk may refer to:

Hans Falk (painter), Swiss painter
Hans Falk (bellmaker), Russian bellmaker